Bryant Akono Bilongo (born 15 September 2001) is an English professional footballer who plays as a defender for Championship club Middlesbrough.

Club career
Released by AFC Wimbledon at a young age, Bilongo went onto join Hanworth Villa youth side before eventually making the step up into the first-team during the 2020–21 campaign, in which he featured ten times. 

Following his breakthrough season, Bilongo joined Isthmian League Premier Division side, Kingstonian in June 2021. Impressing early on, his form attracted the attention of both Football League and Premier League sides, including Chelsea who subsequently trialled the full-back in October 2021. Despite this, Bilongo agreed to join Middlesbrough three months later for an undisclosed fee. On 10 August 2022, he made his first-team debut for Middlesbrough, replacing Paddy McNair during an EFL Cup first round tie defeat against Barnsley, with half an hour remaining.

Career statistics

References

External links

2001 births
Living people
English footballers
Association football defenders
AFC Wimbledon players
Hanworth Villa F.C. players
Kingstonian F.C. players
Middlesbrough F.C. players
Combined Counties Football League players
Isthmian League players
English Football League players